Lost and Found is an album by guitarist Ralph Towner recorded in 1995 and released on the ECM label.

Reception 
The Allmusic review by Thom Jurek awarded the album 4 stars, stating, "This is a guitar player's recording, but it is obvious that Towner writes for ensembles equally well, and he has clearly written the vast majority of this recording for this particular ensemble. It's seamless from start to finish; it moves and is far less ponderous than some of his earlier outings; it's a winner for sure".

Track listing 
All compositions by Ralph Towner except as indicated
 "Harbinger" - 2:34 
 "Trill Ride" (Marc Johnson, Ralph Towner) - 3:01 
 "Élan Vital" - 6:20 
 "Summer's End" - 5:15 
 "Col Legno" (Johnson) - 3:16 
 "Soft Landing" (Denney Goodhew, Johnson, Towner) - 2:17 
 "Flying Cows" (Goodhew) - 4:57 
 "Mon Enfant" (Anonymous) - 4:06 
 "A Breath Away" - 5:17 
 "Scrimshaw" - 1:26 
 "Midnight Blue... Red Shift" (Goodhew) - 3:27 
 "Moonless" (Johnson, Towner) - 4:39 
 "Sco Cone" (Johnson) - 3:44 
 "Tattler" - 3:08 
 "Taxi's Waiting" - 4:34 
Recorded at Rainbow Studio in Oslo, Norway in May 1995

Personnel 
 Ralph Towner — twelve-string guitar, classical guitar
 Denney Goodhew — sopranino saxophone, soprano saxophone, baritone saxophone, bass clarinet
 Marc Johnson — bass
 Jon Christensen — drums

References 

ECM Records albums
Ralph Towner albums
1996 albums
Albums produced by Manfred Eicher